Rafael Prohens Espinoza (born 12 June 1955) is a Chilean politician and entrepreneur who currently serves as a member of the Senate of his country.

References

External links
 BCN Profile

1955 births

Living people
Chilean people
21st-century Chilean politicians
National Renewal (Chile) politicians